Black Forest Melody is a 1956 West German romantic comedy film directed by Géza von Bolváry and starring Carl Wery, Gardy Granass, and Willy Fritsch.

The film's sets were designed by the art directors Hans Kuhnert and Paul Markwitz. It was shot at the Tempelhof Studios in Berlin and on location in Hamburg at the Circus Roland.

Cast

References

Bibliography

External links 

1956 films
1956 romantic comedy films
German romantic comedy films
West German films
1950s German-language films
Films directed by Géza von Bolváry
Films set in the United States
Circus films
UFA GmbH films
Films shot at Tempelhof Studios
1950s German films